The Annie Award for Writing in a Television/Broadcasting Production is an Annie Award given annually to the best writing in animated television or broadcasting productions. From 1995 to 1996, both films and television productions were included in the  Best Individual Achievement for Writing in the Field of Animation award. A separate category for writing in animated television/broadcasting productions was created at the 26th Annie Awards.

Winners and nominees

1990s
 Best Individual Achievement for Story Contribution in the Field of Animation

 Best Individual Achievement for Writing in the Field of Animation

 Outstanding Achievement for Writing in a Television Production

2000s

2010s

2020s

See also
 Writers Guild of America Award for Television: Animation

References

External links 
 Annie Awards: Legacy

Annie Awards
Screenwriting awards for television